The Fuzuli–Shusha highway, also called Victory Road, is a  highway in Azerbaijan that runs from Fuzuli to Shusha. Construction began on 16 November during the visit of President Ilham Aliyev and Vice President Mehriban Aliyeva to the liberated Fuzuli and Jabrayil districts.

On 7 November 2021, Aliyev and Aliyeva inaugurated the highway in Fuzuli District.

References

Roads in Azerbaijan